The La Vieille Formation is a geologic formation in Quebec. It preserves fossils dating back to the Silurian period.

See also

 List of fossiliferous stratigraphic units in Quebec

References
 

Silurian Quebec
Silurian southern paleotemperate deposits
Silurian southern paleotropical deposits